1,2,4,5-Cyclohexanetetrol (also named cyclohexane-1,2,4,5-tetrol, 1,2,4,5-tetrahydroxycyclohexane, or para-cyclohexanetetrol) is an organic compound whose molecule can be described as a cyclohexane with four hydroxyl (OH) groups substituted for hydrogen atoms on two non-adjacent pairs of adjacent carbon atoms.

There are 7 isomers with this same structural formula, which are among the 43 isomers of cyclohexanetetrol.  They are all polyols, more specifically tetrols and cyclitols.  Some of them have biologically important roles in some organisms.

Isomers and nomenclature
There are 7 different isomers of this compound, that differ in the orientation of the four hydroxyls relative to the mean plane of the ring.  They can be denoted by the letter "α" or "β" after each carbon index ("2α","2β","4β", etc.), to indicate the corresponding side of the plane relative to the 1-hydroxyl; or by listing all the "α" indices, then a slash "/", then the "β" indices (or "0" if the second list is empty).

The possible isomers are:

 1α,2α,4α,5α-, 1,2,4,5/0-, or all-cis, with all hydroxyls on the same side (achiral).
 1α,2α,4α,5β- or 1,2,4/5-, and its enantiomer.
 1α,2α,4β,5β- or 1,2/4,5- (achiral).
 1α,2β,4β,5α- or 1,4/2,5- (achiral).
 1α,2β,4α,5β- or 1,2/4,5-, and its enantiomer.

Synthesis

Methods which have been employed for the preparation of 1,2,4,5-cyclohexanetetrols include: reduction or hydrogenation of (1) tri-hydroxycyclohexanones, (2) hydroxylated aromatics, or (3) hydroxylated quinones; the (4) hydrogenolysis of dibromocyclohexanetetrols; the (5) hydration of diepoxycyclohexanes; and the hydroxylation of (6) cyclohexadienes or (7) cyclohexenediols.

In 1998, Ahmet Maras and others reported the synthesis of racemic 1,4/2,5-cyclohexanetetrol (the chiral trans-trans para isomer) by hydroxyla-tion of 1,4-cyclohexadiene with stoichiometric amount of hydrogen peroxide (30% in 1-butanol), with selenium dioxide as catalyzer.  The yield was 88%, with no trace of the 1,5/2,4 isomer.  The racemic 1,4/2,5 isomer is soluble in ethanol, and yields colorless crystals with melting point 194–196 °C.  The (+) enantiomer is betitol, a natural product first identified in sugar beets. The pure 1α,2α,4α,5α enantiomer crystallize as a monohydrate in the monoclinic C2 group (a = 10.675 Å, b = 7.3502 Å, c = 5.1968 Å, β = 103.877°)

References

Polyols
Cyclohexanols